{{Infobox newspaper
| name         = The Villanovan
| logo         = 
| image        =
| caption      = Front page of The Villanovans Dec. 3, 2009 issue.
| type         = Weekly newspaper
| format       = Broadsheet: 11" × 13"
| owners       = Villanova University
| foundation   = 1916
| chiefeditor  = Colin Beazley and Evelyn Melkonian
| circulation  = 750
| headquarters = Corr Hall Basement  Villanova University  800 Lancaster Ave  Villanova, PA 19085
| website      = Official Website
}}The Villanovan'' has been the officially recognized and accredited student newspaper of Villanova University since its founding in 1916.  The tabloid-style, weekly paper publishes every Thursday during the semester and maintains a circulation of 750 copies which are distributed throughout the Villanova campus and at various locations in the surrounding community.  The Villanovan also has a digital circulation website which regularly releases its material. It is staffed by over 150 undergraduate students.  All content of The Villanovan is the responsibility of the editors and the editorial board and do not necessarily represent the views of the administration, faculty and students of Villanova University unless specifically stated. While The Villanovan is owned by Villanova University, Villanova University subscribes to the principle of responsible freedom of expression for the student editors.

2022 StaffEditorial BoardEditors-in-Chief: Colin Beazley and Evelyn Melkonian

Associate Editor in Chief: Christina Aron

Senior Editor: Catherine McCuskerSection Editors'''

News: Sarah Sweeney and Sarah Wisniewski

Sports: Meghann Morhardt and Matthew Ryan

Opinion: Isabella Irwin and Jacqueline Thomas

Culture: A.J. Fezza, Elena Rouse, and Chloe Miller

Photography: Olivia Pasquale

Copy Desk Chief: Molly Baker

Digital Editor: Rachel Reiniger

Subscriptions
Subscriptions are available at a cost of $55 per semester or $100 per year.

Awards (Since 2005)
 Newspaper Pacemaker Finalist from the Associated Collegiate Press  (2010)
 First Place with Special Merit from the American Scholastic Press Association (2009–2010)
 Best Sports Coverage from the American Scholastic Press Association (2009–2010)
 Best Sports Photo from the American Scholastic Press Association for The Magazine section (2009–2010)
 First Place with Special Merit from the American Scholastic Press Association (2008–2009)
 Best Section Award from the American Scholastic Press Association for The Magazine section (2008–2009)
 Best Investigative Reporting Award from the American Scholastic Press Association (2008–2009)
 Second Place Keystone Press Award for Spot News from the Pennsylvania Newspaper Association (2009)
 First Place for Broadsheet News Page Design for Newspapers from the Columbia Scholastic Press Association (2008)
 First Place for Black & White Full Page Advertisement for Newspapers from the Columbia Scholastic Press Association (2008)
 Certificate of Merit in Sports Photograph Portfolio of Work for Newspapers from the Columbia Scholastic Press Association (2008)
 Certificate of Merit in Editorial Page Cartoons for Newspapers from the Columbia Scholastic Press Association (2008)
 Second Place for Tabloid Feature Cover from the Columbia Scholastic Press Association's Collegiate Circle (2007)
 Certificate of Merit for Editorial Writing from the Columbia Scholastic Press Association's Collegiate Circle (2007)
 Certificate of Merit for portfolio of work in the Feature Photograph category from the Columbia Scholastic Press Association's Collegiate Circle (2007)
 Pennsylvania Newspaper Association's Keystone Press Award for Best Feature Story
 First Place with Special Merit and Outstanding Sports Coverage from the American Scholastic Press Association
 American Scholastic Press Association Top-Scoring Newspaper for 2007–2008

References

External links 
 Official website of The Villanovan

Student newspapers published in Pennsylvania
Publications established in 1916
Villanova University